Nemane Adventist High School is a Seventh-day Adventist school located in Tsholotsho District, Zimbabwe.  It is administered by the West Zimbabwe Conference of the Seventh-day Adventist Church.

History
Since its establishment the school has a history of academic excellence and producing outstanding members of the society, producing the best academic results in Tsholotsho District. The school enrolled its first “A” level (form 5) students in 2004. It is one of the best “A” level schools in the province, a standard which has been maintained until today. Year after year Nemane Adventist High School remains one of the best school in the province.

Location

Education system
Students entering Form I, usually aged 12–13, compete for places at the school based on their Grade 7 examination results, as well as school-based interviews and placement tests. The school consists of three levels: ZJC (Zimbabwe Junior Certificate) which includes Forms I and II; "O" level which includes Forms III and IV; and "A" level which includes Forms V and VI. The ZJC Core Curriculum consists of 8 subjects: English, Ndebele, Mathematics, Science, History, Geography, Bible Knowledge, and a Practical Subject (i.e. Fashion and Fabrics, Woodwork, Agriculture, Metalwork, etc.) Zimbabwe phased out the ZJC examinations in 2001, but has maintained the same curricular framework for general Form 1 and 2 education and plan to renew this set of examinations at the end of Form 2 education.

Based on their Form 1 and 2 reports, students are assigned to courses and tracked classes for their "O" level studies for Forms III and IV.

The school also offers Hexco National Foundation courses in the Following Areas: Motor Maintenance, Brick and Block laying, Cabinet making, Computer operations and Packages, Computer Programming, Computer systems installation Servicing and repairs, Horticulture, Business English, Book Keeping, Office Practice, Garment Construction.

Ordinary level
Since the early 1990s and until April 2002, GCE "O" level examinations were set and marked in Zimbabwe by the Zimbabwe Examinations Council (ZIMSEC) in conjunction with the University of Cambridge International Examination GCE system. Marks from highest to lowest are A, B, C, D, E, U with A, B, and C as passing marks.

Subjects being offered for "O" level examinations include:

 Sciences: Biology, Chemistry, Physics, Physics with Chemistry, Integrated Science, Mathematics
 Arts: English Literature, Religious Education, Geography, History, Sociology
 Commercial Subjects: Accounts, Business Studies, Economics, Computer Studies
 Languages: English, Ndebele
 Practical Subjects: Woodwork, Agriculture, Fashion & Fabrics.
To receive a passing ZIMSEC "O" level GCE certificate, a student needs to have passed at least five subjects including English language with a mark of "C" or better. The English and mathematics "O" level examinations serve as gatekeepers for many students who cannot proceed without them despite their other exam scores. Entrance into "A" level programs is quite competitive, with the majority of "O" level students either returning to small-scale farming, entering the work force or proceeding to a vocational course, a technical school or a nursing or teaching college. Only students with the best scores manage to find a high school place in an "A" level program.

Advanced "A" level
At the Advanced "A" level, students choose among science, commercial and art subjects to study for Forms V and VI. The vast majority of students take three subjects at "A" level, with a few very gifted students at elite schools opting for four subjects. In addition, many A level students take "English for Communication”, which before 2004 was called “General Paper, " a very challenging exam that assesses both English writing skills and knowledge of current events both nationally and worldwide. English for Communication is marked on a 1–9 scale with 1 as the highest mark and a 1–6 as a pass. Through 2001, "A" level examinations written in Zimbabwe continued to be set and marked at the University of Cambridge in the UK; they have been considerably more challenging than "O" levels, yielding far less favourable pass rates. Starting June 2002 exams, A levels were localised and run by ZIMSEC. It is common for a capable student to have higher "O" level exam marks than her/his "A" level exam marks.

"A" level subjects being offered include:

 Arts: English Literature, Geography, Ndebele/Zulu Language and Literature, Divinity, History, Sociology
 Commercial: Business Studies, Economics, Accounting, Computing
 Sciences: Biology, Chemistry, Physics, Mathematics, Agriculture

References

Schools in Zimbabwe
Education in Matabeleland North Province
Educational institutions established in 2004
2004 establishments in Zimbabwe